O'Connell is a surname of Irish origin. It is an anglicisation of the Irish Ó Conaill (meaning "descendant of Conall"). The personal name Conall is composed of the elements con (from cú meaning "hound") and gal (meaning "valour"). The O'Connell family were a noted clan of Derrynane, Munster.

Surname
 Aaron D. O'Connell (born 1981), American experimental quantum physicist, creator of the world's first quantum machine
 Aaron O'Connell (born 1986), American model and actor
 Aidan O'Connell (born 1998), American football player
 Anthony O'Connell (1938–2012), American Catholic bishop
 Arthur O'Connell (1908–1981), American actor
 Bill O'Connell (born 1957), American photographer
 Billie Eilish O'Connell, known as Billie Eilish (born 2001), American singer and songwriter
 Beverly Reid O'Connell (1965–2017), American judge
 Carlos O'Connell (born 1963), Irish decathlete
 Charlie O'Connell (disambiguation), several people
 Christian O'Connell (born 1973), English radio DJ
 Conall O'Connell, senior Australian public servant
 Dáithí Ó Conaill (David O'Connell) (1938–1991), Irish republican
 Daniel O'Connell (1775–1847), Irish politician
 Daniel P. O'Connell (1885–1977), American politician from New York
 David O'Connell (disambiguation), several people
 Denis J. O'Connell (1849–1927), American Catholic bishop
 Eileen O'Connell (Irish writer) (c.1743–c.1800), Irish poet
 Eileen O'Connell (politician) (1947–2000), Canadian politician, member of the Nova Scotia House of Assembly
 Finneas O'Connell (born 1997), American actor and musician
 Frédérique Émilie Auguste O'Connell (1823–1885) German–French painter
 Grace O’Connell, American bioengineer
 Helen O'Connell (1920–1993), American singer, actress, and dancer
 Helen O'Connell (urologist) (born 1962), Australian urologist
 Jack O'Connell (disambiguation), several people
 Jerry O'Connell (born 1974), American actor
 Joe O'Connell (disambiguation), several people
 John O'Connell (disambiguation), several people
 Joseph O'Connell (disambiguation), several people
 Martin O'Connell (disambiguation), several people
 Maura O'Connell (born (1958), Irish singer and actress, singer
 Maurice O'Connell (disambiguation), several people
 Max O'Connell (born 1936), Australian cricket umpire
 Mick O'Connell (born 1937), Irish footballer
 Mike O'Connell (born 1955), American ice hockey player and general manager
 Paddy or Pat or Patrick O'Connell (disambiguation), several people
 Paul O'Connell (born 1979), Irish rugby player
 Ryan O'Connell (brn 1986), American writer, actor, and producer
 Stephen C. O'Connell (1916–2001), Florida Supreme Court justice (1955–1967), president of the University of Florida (1967–1973)
 Taaffe O'Connell (born 1951), American actress and publisher
 Terri O'Connell (born 1964), American motor racing driver and transgender
 Thomas J. O'Connell (1882–1969), Irish politician
 William O'Connell (disambiguation), several people

See also
 O'Connell of Derrynane, Gaelic Irish noble family
 O'Connell baronets

Given name
 William O'Connell Bradley (1847–1914), U.S. Senator from Kentucky
 Conal Holmes O'Connell O'Riordan (1874–1948), Irish dramatist and novelist

Fictional characters
 Rick O'Connell, main character in American The Mummy films
 Maggie O'Connell, in American television series Northern Exposure
 Camille O’Connell, in American television series The Originals

References

Irish families
Surnames of Irish origin
Anglicised Irish-language surnames
English-language surnames